Julio César Rincón Ramírez is a Colombian matador born in Bogotá on 5 September 1965.

References
Biographical notice on Mundo Toro
Biographical notice Portal Taurino
Interview on the El Mundo newspaper

1965 births
Living people
Colombian bullfighters